The Pratt, Read and Company Factory Complex is an historic industrial facility located in Deep River, Connecticut.  Established in 1863 by Pratt-Read and significantly enlarged in 1914, it was one of the principal sites of ivory processing in Connecticut, production combs, buttons, and piano keys.  The complex was listed on the National Register of Historic Places on August 30, 1984.  It has been converted to residences.

Description and history
The former Pratt, Read factory consists of two clusters of mainly brick buildings lining the Deep River north of the town center, west of Main Street and bounded on the north by Spring Street and on the south by Bridge Street.  The main building of the complex is set close to Main Street, rising five stories, with an architecturally elaborate entry tower near its center.  Wings extend from this building toward the river.  The second complex stands across the river, and is dominated by a four-story concrete building.

The eastern half of the complex was developed by the Pratt-Read Company beginning in 1863, although no buildings survive that predate 1881.  George Read first began processing ivory in this area in 1809, which were taken over by Pratt, Read in 1863.  The older buildings were all destroyed by fire in 1881, with the present main structure built immediately after the fire.  These facilities were used to process ivory, notably for combs, buttons, and piano keys, and eventually entire piano keyboard actions.  In 1914 the company expanded on the western bank of the river, developing the complex that stands off Bridge Street.  It was one of the works of a pioneer of the use of reinforced concrete in factory construction, Ernest J. Ransome.

See also
National Register of Historic Places listings in Middlesex County, Connecticut

References

Industrial buildings and structures on the National Register of Historic Places in Connecticut
Colonial Revival architecture in Connecticut
Industrial buildings completed in 1881
Buildings and structures in Middlesex County, Connecticut
Deep River, Connecticut
National Register of Historic Places in Middlesex County, Connecticut
Ideal Industries
1881 establishments in Connecticut